The 2004 America East Conference baseball tournament took place from May 27 through 29 at Mahaney Diamond in Orono, Maine. The top four regular season finishers of the league's eight teams qualified for the double-elimination tournament. In the championship game, fourth-seeded Stony Brook defeated second-seeded Maine, 3-1, to win its first tournament championship. As a result, Stony Brook received the America East's automatic bid to the 2004 NCAA Tournament, the program's first in Division I.

Seeding 
The top four finishers from the regular season were seeded one through four based on conference winning percentage only. They then played in a double-elimination format. In the first round, the one and four seeds were matched up in one game, while the two and three seeds were matched up in the other.

Results

All-Tournament Team 
The following players were named to the All-Tournament Team.

Most Outstanding Player 
Stony Brook outfielder Isidro Fortuna was named Most Outstanding Player.

References 

America East Conference Baseball Tournament
Tournament
American East Conference baseball tournament
America East Conference baseball tournament
College sports tournaments in Maine
Baseball competitions in Maine
Sports in Orono, Maine